Petri Kokko is a Finnish motorcycle speedway rider who was a member of Finland team at 2001 Speedway World Cup. Kokko won the British Elite League with Eastbourne Eagles.

Career details

World Championships 
 Team World Championship (Speedway World Team Cup and Speedway World Cup)
 2000 - 2nd place in Quarter-Final A
 2001 - 9th place

Domestic competitions 
 Individual Finnish Championship
 1987 - 13th place (3 pts)
 1988 - 4th place (12 pts)
 1989 - 12th place (5 pts)
 1991 - 14th place (3 pts)
 1992 - 11th place (4 pts)
 Individual Junior Finnish Championship
 1990 - 4th place (11+3 pts)
 Elite League
 2000 - Winner

See also 
 Finland national speedway team

References 

Finnish speedway riders
Eastbourne Eagles riders
Reading Racers riders
Newcastle Diamonds riders
Living people
Year of birth missing (living people)
Place of birth missing (living people)